This article gives an overview of liberal parties in Brazil. It is limited to liberal parties with substantial support, mainly proved by having had a representation in parliament. The sign ⇒ means a reference to another party in that scheme. For inclusion in this scheme it isn't necessary so that parties labeled themselves as a liberal party.

Introduction 
Liberalism was organized in Brazil since 1831 in a traditional way as the opposition to conservatism. With the republican revolution of 1889 organized liberalism disappeared. Some liberal parties were founded in twentieth century. Since 1966 liberalism was best represented by the Democratic Movement. After multi-partyism became a fact, more parties labeled themselves as liberal, but the word was used by moderate conservative forces. At the moment three parties name themselves liberal, but the Liberal Front Party (Partido da Frente Liberal) is a conservative party, member of the International Democrat Union. The right-wing Liberal Party (Partido Liberal) can be considered a conservative-liberal party. The centrist Brazilian Democratic Movement (Movimento Democrático Brasileiro) takes a liberal position the spectrum.

Left-wing liberalism in Brazil 
Left-wing liberal movements in Brazil include some centrist parties and organizations rooted in socialism in the past, including Cidadania and Livres.

The timeline

Liberal Party (1831)
1831: In resistance to the imperial regime liberals formed in 1831 the Liberal Party (Partido Liberal), loosely connected to the urban petty bourgeoisie. It became the leading progressive party during the monarchy.
1863: A left wing faction forms the ⇒ Progressive Party.
1868: The Progressive Party reunited with the party.
1869: A left wing faction formed the ⇒ New Liberal Party.
1882: A new Progressive Party is formed.
1889: After the fall of the monarchy the party vanished.

Progressive Party (1863)
1863: A left wing faction of the ⇒ Liberal Party forms the Progressive Party (Partido Progressista) .
1868: The party reunited with the ⇒ Liberal Party

New Liberal Party
1869: A left wing faction of the ⇒ Liberal Party forms the New Liberal Party, led by Joaquím Nabuco. Unclear is the further existence of the party.

Progressive Party (1882)
1882: A left wing faction of the ⇒ Liberal Party forms the Progressive Party (Partido Progressista).
1889: After the fall of the monarchy the party disappeared.

Republican Party
1870: The Republican Party (Partido Republicano), a party of the urban middle class, is formed.
1889: After the fall of the monarchy the party disappeared.

Liberal Alliance
1930: The liberal bourgeoisie formed the Liberal Alliance (Aliança Liberal), led by Getúlio Vargas. After he lost the 1930 rigged elections, the party came to power in a revolution.
1934: When Vargas establishes in 1934 an authoritarian regime, the party fell apart.

Brazilian Democratic Movement
1966: The military government allowed in a bi-partisan system the formation of a democratic opposition party, the Brazilian Democratic Movement (Movimento Democrático Brasileiro). In this party liberals are united with social democrats, socialists and right leaning opponents of the rightist military government. The party is led by Oscar Passos, Pedroso Horta (since 1970) and Ulysses Guimarães.
1979: The party is reorganized into the Brazilian Democratic Movement Party (Partido do Movimento Democrático Brasileiro, PMDB).
1981: The ⇒ Popular Party merged into the PMDB.
1988: The Brazilian Social Democracy Party seceded from the party.

Popular Party
1980: A liberal faction of the National Renewal Alliance established the liberal Popular Party (Partido Popular), led by Tancredo de Almeida Neves.
1981: The PP merged into the ⇒ Party of the Brazilian Democratic Movement.

Liberal Front Party
1985: The centre-right Liberal Front Party (Partido da Frente Liberal) is formed by a secession from the Democratic Social Party.
2007: PFL changes name into the Democrats (Democratas).

Liberal Party (1985)
1985: The centre-right Liberal Party (Partido Liberal) is formed.

Libertarians
2005: The Libertarians (Libertários) is formed.
It is a libertarian party with some classic liberal members.
Libertarians has no electoral register, still can not participate in elections.

New Party
2011: The New Party (Partido Novo) is formed.

MBL
2014: The Free Brazil Movement (Movimento Brasil Livre) is founded.

Livres
2016: The Free movement (Livres) is founded.

Liberal leaders
 Joaquim Nabuco
 Tancredo Neves
 Ulysses Guimarães
 Rui Barbosa
 Roberto Campos

See also
 History of Brazil
 Politics of Brazil
 List of political parties in Brazil
 Lulism - In Latin America, including Brazil, the term "liberal" tends to be avoided in the left-wing camp, Lulism is be practically close to social liberalism.

References

 
Brazil
Brazil